Baijia Town is a rural town under the administration of Liuyang City, Hunan Province, People's Republic of China. It borders Jiangbei Town of Changsha County in the north, Zhentou Town in the east and southeast, Yuntian Town of Zhuzhou in the south, and Huangxing Town in the west.

Administrative divisions
The town is divided into four villages and one community: 
 Bailing Community
 Dutou Village
 Nanzhou Village
 Xianhu Village
 Shuangyuan Village

Geography
Liuyang River, also known as the mother river, flows through the town.

Xianrenzao Reservoir is the largest reservoir and largest water body in the town.

Economy
The principal industries in the area are agriculture, granite, limestone and fireworks.

Education
 Baijia Middle School

Transportation

Railway
The Shanghai–Kunming railway, from Shanghai to Kunming, runs through the town.

The Hangzhou–Changsha high-speed railway, which connects Hangzhou and Changsha, runs through the town.

County Road
The County Road X030 passes across the town west to east.

Attractions
The main attractions are the Former Residence of Chen Xi and the Temple of General. Moreover, the Xianrenzao Reservoir is a famous tourist spot nowadays.

References

External links

2000 Census information from 

Divisions of Liuyang
Liuyang